Jacob Junior Nayinggul is an Australian actor. His first screen role was in High Ground For his role in the film he was nominated for the 2021 AACTA Award for Best Actor in a Leading Role.

References

External links
 
 

Living people
Australian male film actors
Indigenous Australian male actors
Year of birth missing (living people)